Foreign Land may refer to:

 Foreign Land (film), a 1996 Brazilian action film
 Foreign Land (novel), a novel by Jonathan Raban
 "Foreign Land" (song), a song by Eskimo Joe